Kaj Holger Larsen (29 May 1925 – 7 December 2014) was a Danish rower. He competed at the 1948 Summer Olympics in London with the men's eight where they were eliminated in the round one repêchage.

References

1925 births
2014 deaths
Danish male rowers
Olympic rowers of Denmark
Rowers at the 1948 Summer Olympics
People from Roskilde
European Rowing Championships medalists
Sportspeople from Region Zealand